The 102nd Infantry Regiment was an infantry regiment of the French Revolutionary Wars and the Napoleonic Wars. Reconstituted several times in the 19th century, it took part in the Second Opium War in China, then in the First and Second World Wars, being disbanded in 1940.

French Royal Army
Its ancestor regiments were the Infantry Regiment of the Line Le Dauphin (Nr. 29) and Royal-Deux Ponts (Nr 99). The Regiment was raised in 1667 by Michel De Fisicat, as Le Dauphin (nr. 29) and on 26 April 1775 split into two regiments.  The 1st and 3rd battalions retained the old title and number and the 2nd and rth battalions became the new Infantry Regiment Perche (Nr 30).

The Revolutionary Wars as Infantry Regiment of the Line Perche (Nr 30)

Campaigns

Initially, the Regiment served in the Army of the Center, at Metz. Following the Battle of Valmy on 20 September 1792, the Regiment was assigned to the Army of the Ardennes.  In 1793, the Regiment saw action in the Meuse campaign. In 1794, it underwent its first amalgamation (17 May), under the Levée en Masse, and became the 2nd battalion 59th Demi-Brigade of Battle, with the 4th battalion, Volunteers of Paris, also called 'l'Oratoire and the 7th battalion of the Rhône-et-Loire, in the Army of the Moselle.

In 1797, the Regiment was part of the Armée de Sambre-et-Meuse.  In 1798, as part of the Army of Germany and the Army of Mayence (Mainz), the Regiment saw action in the Rhineland.  In 1799, as part of the Army of Mayence, it was transferred to the Army of the Danube, under the general command of Jean-Baptiste Jourdan; the Regiment was part of the I Division, under the immediate command of Pierre Marie Barthélemy Ferino, and participated in action at the Battle of Ostrach (20–21 March 1799), and the Battle of Stockach, 25–26 March 25–26, 1799.  On 25 September 1799, the regiment fought at the Battle of Zurich.
 Battle of Caldiero

The Napoleonic Wars

War Of The Third Coalition
 Battle of Austerlitz

War of the Fourth Coalition
 Battle of Halle
 Battle of Lübeck
 Battle of Mohrungen
 Battle of Friedland
 Battle of Schleiz

The Peninsular war

 Dos de Mayo Uprising
 Battle of Zornoza
 Battle of Valmaseda
 Battle of Espinosa
 Battle of Talavera
 Battle of Fuentes de Oñoro
 Battle of Arroyo dos Molinos
 Battle of Maya
 Occupation of Pamplona,
 Battle of the Bidassoa (1813), Spelleto, and
 Battle of Bayonne

War of the Fifth Coalition
 Battle of Essling
 Battle of Wagram

War of the Sixth Coalition
 Siege of Danzig, Wurschen, Gieshubel,
 Battle of Dresden, Grieffenberg, Elsen,
 Battle of Dohna,
 Battle of Bautzen
 Siege of Genoa (1814) 2 battalions present

War of the Seventh Coalition
 Battle of Lille
 Battle of Courtrai

Greek War of Independence

The Morea expedition
 1828 : Expédition de Morée

Sources

Citations and notes

Bibliography

Regiments of France in the French Revolutionary Wars
Regiments of the First French Empire
Infantry regiments of France
Military units and formations established in 1791
Military units and formations disestablished in 1940